Pecara Stadium is a multi-purpose stadium in Široki Brijeg, Bosnia and Herzegovina.  It is currently used mostly for football matches and is the home ground of NK Široki Brijeg, and is also used for the final match of football tournament Mjesne Zajednice. The stadium has a capacity of 7,000 spectators.

References

External links

Pecara Stadium at thefootballstadiums.com
Stadion Pecara at Europlan-online.de

p
NK Široki Brijeg
Multi-purpose stadiums in Bosnia and Herzegovina